The 1930 Cork Senior Football Championship was the 42nd staging of the Cork Senior Football Championship since its establishment by the Cork County Board in 1887. 

Collins entered the championship as the defending champions.

On 21 September 1930, Macroom won the championship following a 2-08 to 2-03 defeat of Na Deasúnaigh in the final. This was their sixth championship title overall and their first title since 1926.

Results

Final

References

Cork Senior Football Championship